The Fertile Land Protection Movement is a movement started by the farmers of Manesar villages—including Kho, Kasan, Mokulwas, Kharakari and Fakarpur —  who filed a writ petition in the Supreme Court of India in March 2011 to avoid acquisition of their land by the state government.  In April, the court gave stay order on the land acquisition thus giving breather to the farmers who own 1,100 acres of land near the industrial town of IMT (Industrial Model Township).

Land acquisition laws in India are under intense criticism by the beleaguered farmers whose lands are acquired for the urbanisation or industrialisation. They always rue that they are paid compensation which is much less than the market price. This move of acquisition coupled with industrialisation/ urbanisation renders the poor farmers landless while snatching away their only source of livelihood—land. This has led to several protests and discontent in different parts of the country. Even much-criticized Naxal movement also has its seeds in the state-sponsored land acquisition few decades ago.
The latest glaring example of farmers’ protest was seen in the Greater Noida area which is being carved out of the villages, which were acquired for the urbanisation. In Greater Noida, the protesting farmers turned violent and attacked the cops on duty which led to huge protests and nationwide movement which was further fuelled by the strong support by the Indian media. 
After that untoward episode of farmers' violence, it was urged by the social activists and policy makers that the time was ripe to revisit the anti-farmers’ acquisition policy. Now, the plans are afoot to repeal the century-old acquisition laws and also to replace them with a new law which is friendly to farmers. The new law will be known as — Land Acquisition, Rehabilitation and Resettlement Act.

References

External links 
 Hindustan Times
 Hindustan Times

Agriculture in Haryana